The Sherburne Ranger Station  in Glacier National Park is an example of the National Park Service Rustic style. Located in the Swiftcurrent portion of the park, it was built in 1926. It is part of a small historic district that includes a mess hall and subsidiary structures, formerly known as the Sherburne Road Camp, established in 1931. The ranger station closely resembles the ranger stations at Belly River and Lake McDonald. A checking station at the road remains substantially intact.

References

External links

 at the National Park Service's NRHP database

Ranger stations in Glacier National Park (U.S.)
Park buildings and structures on the National Register of Historic Places in Montana
Houses completed in 1925
National Park Service rustic in Montana
Historic districts on the National Register of Historic Places in Montana
National Register of Historic Places in Glacier County, Montana
National Register of Historic Places in Glacier National Park
1925 establishments in Montana
Log houses in the United States
Log buildings and structures on the National Register of Historic Places in Montana